Supervan is a 1977 American vansploitation film directed by Lamar Card. It features a very heavily modified van central to the storyline. It is an action adventure comedy road movie and is rated PG.

Plot
Clint Morgan (Mark Schneider) goes to The Invitational Freak-Out for custom van enthusiasts intending to enter his van, The Sea Witch, in a contest. In saving a runaway, Karen (Kate Saylor), from rapist bikers, Clint loses his van. He goes to his friend Bosley (Tom Kindle), a rebel designer, who lets Clint and Karen enter his solar-powered laser-firing custom van, Vandora, in place of The Sea Witch.

Cast
 Mark Schneider as Clint Morgan 
 Katie Saylor as Karen Trenton 
 Morgan Woodward as T.B. Trenton 
 Len Lesser as Banks 
 Skip Riley as Vince
 Bruce Kimball as Sarge
 Tom Kindle as Boseley
 George Barris as King of the Customizers
 Charles Bukowski as Wet T-shirt Contest Water Boy

The van

The titular "Supervan" was customized by George Barris, based on a stock Dodge Sportsman van.  Among its most unusual features, it featured solar panels, the ability to emit laser beams, and an entire custom body. Coffman called it a "bizarre, 70s-futuristic beast", and there were scale reproductions sold as merchandising for the film, which is unusual for the genre. The film features a cameo appearance by Charles Bukowski

Quotes

See also
 List of American films of 1977

References

External links
 
 
 

1977 films
American independent films
Vansploitation films
1970s English-language films
1970s American films
1977 independent films